Cliff Roquemore (28 September 1948 – 5 February 2002) was an American writer, producer and director. Principally active in Detroit theater, he was also involved with the production of several blaxploitation films, including The Human Tornado (1976), Petey Wheatstraw (1978) and Disco Godfather (1979).

Roquemore also wrote the musical, The Gospel Truth, which toured nationally, winning NAACP Image Awards. He also directed Eartha Kitt's one-woman show in 1990. He died of cancer in 2002.

References

External links

1948 births
2002 deaths
Writers from Detroit
African-American film directors
African-American dramatists and playwrights
African-American theater directors
American theatre directors
Blaxploitation film directors
20th-century African-American people
21st-century African-American people
Wayne State University alumni